Moreau may refer to:

People
Moreau (surname)

Places
Moreau, New York
Moreau River (disambiguation)

Music
An alternate name for the band Cousteau, used for the album Nova Scotia in the United States for legal reasons

In fiction
Dr. Moreau, the anti villain of The Island of Dr. Moreau, an 1896 science fiction novel by H. G. Wells, and various film adaptations
Andre-Louis Moreau, the hero of Scaramouche, a historical novel by Rafael Sabatini.
Moreau series of novels by S. Andrew Swann
Jeff "Joker" Moreau, flight lieutenant in the video game Mass Effect
Moreau, half-human-half-animal race in the role-playing game D20 Modern
Damien Moreau, villain in season 3 of the television show Leverage